Liptovská Teplička is a large village and municipality in Poprad District in the Prešov Region of northern Slovakia.

Geography
The municipality lies at an elevation of 919 metres (3,015 ft) and covers an area of 98.69 km² (38.10 mi²). It has a population of about 2270 people.

History
In historical records the village was first mentioned in 1634.
Settled probably before 1612 when the village Pohorelá (with that it shares the origins) was first mentioned in written records. The name Teplička (or its Hungarian transcript Teplicska) used till around 1920 when the adjective Liptovská (related to the Liptov region) had been added to distinguish it from other villages with the same name in Slovakia. A new road connecting the village with Poprad was built after World War II, and in the subsequent change of administrative divisions in 1960, the village has been integrated to the Poprad District of the then Eastern-Slovakian region, since 1996 Prešov Region. (The traditional road connecting the village with the historical Liptov region remains now inaccessible for motor cars.)

The name Teplička comes from Teplica, a small creek flowing through the village that does not freeze even in the coldest winters (teplý means 'warm' in Slovak).

References

External links
https://web.archive.org/web/20080111223415/http://www.statistics.sk/mosmis/eng/run.html
http://www.liptovskateplicka.sk

Villages and municipalities in Poprad District